M. Varalakshmi (born 16 April 1974) is an Indian politician and member of the Tamil Nadu Legislative Assembly. She was elected as the representative of the Chengalpattu constituency in the 2016 Tamil Nadu Legislative Assembly election as a member of the Dravida Munnetra Kazhagam.

Personal life 
Varalakshmi is a resident of Appur village in the Kanchipuram district of Tamil Nadu and a diploma graduate of the Kanchipuram Government College of Nursing.

Political career 
Varalakshmi was the representative as the head of the Appur Panchayat between 2006 and 2016.

In the 2016 Tamil Nadu Legislative Assembly election, she was nominated to contest as the candidate of the Dravida Munnetra Kazhagam from the Chengalpattu state assembly constituency in the Kanchipuram district . Her primary opponent in the election was R. Kamalakkannan who was the candidate of the All India Anna Dravida Munnetra Kazhagam. The election resulted in Varalakshmi emerging as the winning candidate with a margin of over 27,000 votes and polling at 45.11% of the votes cast against 34.58% of the votes cast in favor of Kamalakkannan.

Electoral performance

References 

1974 births
Living people
Tamil Nadu MLAs 2016–2021
Dravida Munnetra Kazhagam politicians
Tamil Nadu MLAs 2021–2026